Mariana dos Santos Silva (born February 22, 1990) is a judoka from Brazil who competes in the women's half-middleweight (-63kg). She won a bronze at the 2015 Pan American Games.  That year, she also won gold at the World Military Games.  In 2016, she won the Pan American Judo Championships, having won silver in 2011 and 2015, and bronze medals in 2010 and 2012.  Previously, she won a bronze medal in the 2009 World Junior Championships.  She has appeared at two Olympics for Brazil (2012 and 2016).

References

External links

 
 

Living people
1990 births
Sportspeople from São Paulo (state)
Judoka at the 2012 Summer Olympics
Judoka at the 2016 Summer Olympics
Olympic judoka of Brazil
Brazilian female judoka
Pan American Games bronze medalists for Brazil
Pan American Games medalists in judo
Judoka at the 2015 Pan American Games
Medalists at the 2015 Pan American Games